Fred Lee Robinson (born October 22, 1961) is a former professional American football player who played linebacker for three seasons for the San Diego Chargers and the Miami Dolphins.

He was a member of the 1983 Miami Hurricanes Championship team that beat Nebraska 31-30.

1961 births
Living people
Miami Jackson Senior High School alumni
Players of American football from Miami
American football linebackers
Miami Hurricanes football players
Miami Dolphins players
Navarro Bulldogs football players
San Diego Chargers players